Tunnelhill is a borough that is located in  Cambria and Blair counties in Pennsylvania,  United States. The population was 363 at the 2010 census. Of these, 245 were in Cambria County, and 118 were in Blair County. It is part of the Altoona, PA Metropolitan Statistical Area. Tunnelhill is named after the many railroad tunnels of the Pennsylvania Railroad near here known as the Gallitzin Tunnels.

Geography
Tunnelhill is located at  (40.477501, -78.541363).

According to the United States Census Bureau, the borough has a total area of 0.5 square mile (1.2 km2), all land.

Tunnelhill has the third-highest elevation among towns in Pennsylvania, at 2300 feet.

Demographics

As of the census of 2000, there were 409 people, 178 households, and 100 families living in the borough. The population density was 844.4 people per square mile (329.0/km2). There were 188 housing units at an average density of 388.1 per square mile (151.2/km2). The racial makeup of the borough was 98.78% White, 0.24% Native American, 0.24% Asian, 0.24% Pacific Islander, and 0.49% from two or more races.

There were 178 households, out of which 23.0% had children under the age of 18 living with them, 42.1% were married couples living together, 8.4% had a female householder with no husband present, and 43.8% were non-families. 38.8% of all households were made up of individuals, and 21.9% had someone living alone who was 65 years of age or older. The average household size was 2.27 and the average family size was 3.09.

In the borough the population was spread out, with 19.8% under the age of 18, 8.1% from 18 to 24, 23.7% from 25 to 44, 24.0% from 45 to 64, and 24.4% who were 65 years of age or older. The median age was 44 years. For every 100 females there were 88.5 males. For every 100 females age 18 and over, there were 87.4 males.

The median income for a household in the borough was $22,604, and the median income for a family was $34,500. Males had a median income of $23,500 versus $16,250 for females. The per capita income for the borough was $13,042. About 10.4% of families and 16.9% of the population were below the poverty line, including 22.2% of those under age 18 and 10.3% of those age 65 or over.

References

Populated places established in 1876
Boroughs in Blair County, Pennsylvania
Boroughs in Cambria County, Pennsylvania
1876 establishments in Pennsylvania